Head of Island is an unincorporated community in Livingston Parish, Louisiana, United States.

Amite River Diversion Canal
In May 2019 the U.S. Army Corps of Engineers began approving permits for clearing debris, trees and growth from the coastal waterways at Head of Island. The coastal restoration projects received partial funding from the Gulf of Mexico Energy Security Act.

References

Unincorporated communities in Livingston Parish, Louisiana
Unincorporated communities in Louisiana